Pueraria montana is a species of plant in the botanical family Fabaceae. At least three sub-species (alternatively called varieties) are known. It is closely related to other species in the genus Pueraria (P. edulis and P. phaseoloides) and the common name kudzu is used for all of these species and hybrids between them. The morphological differences between them are subtle, they can breed with each other, and it appears that introduced kudzu populations in the United States have ancestry from more than one of the species.

Description
It is a seasonal climbing plant, growing high where suitable surfaces (trees, cliffs, walls) are available, and also growing as ground cover where there are no vertical surfaces. It has markedly hairy herbaceous stems.

Pueraria montana is native to East Asia, primarily subtropical and temperate regions of China, Japan, and Korea, with trifoliate leaves composed of three leaflets. Each leaflet is large and ovate with two to three lobes each and hair on the underside. The species can fix atmospheric nitrogen, which can supply up to 95% of leaf nitrogen to the plant in poor soils. Along the vines are nodes, points at which stems or tendrils can propagate to increase support and attach to structures. As a twining vine, kudzu uses stems or tendrils that can extend from any node on the vine to attach to and climb most surfaces. In addition, the nodes of the kudzu vine have the ability to root when exposed to soil, further anchoring the vine to the ground. The roots are tuberous and are high in starch and water content, and the twining of the plant allows for less carbon concentration in the construction of woody stems and greater concentration in roots, which aids root growth. The roots can account for up to 40% of total plant biomass.

The flowering period extends from July through October.

Kudzu's primary method of reproduction is asexual vegetative spread (cloning) which is aided by the ability to root wherever a stem is exposed to soil. For sexual reproduction, kudzu is entirely dependent on pollinators.

Although kudzu prefers forest regrowth and edge habitats with high sun exposure, the plant can survive in full sun or partial shade. These attributes of kudzu made it attractive as an ornamental plant for shading porches in the Southeastern United States, but they facilitated the growth of kudzu as it became a “structural parasite” of the southern states, enveloping entire structures when untreated and often referred to as “the vine that ate the south”.

Subspecies and varieties
Pueraria montana var. chinensis (Ohwi) Sanjappa & Pradeep
Pueraria montana var. lobata (Willd.) Sanjappa & Pradeep
Pueraria montana var. thomsonii (Benth.) Wiersema ex D.B. Ward

Taxonomy
The Latin specific epithet montana refers to mountains or coming from mountains.

Invasive species

The natural range of Pueraria montana can be found in India, Myanmar, Indochina, China, Korea, Japan, Thailand, Malaysia, the Pacific Islands, and in north Australia. In its native habitat, it and its closely related species occur across wide areas; the species have diverged genetically due to vicariance. Its invasiveness can be attributed to similarities between both native and newly invaded niches, effectively expanding its habitable range into areas with climates it may not be able to endure otherwise.

Like other exotic species, the introduction to other areas is due to human actions. Seeds are spread by mammals and birds. Kudzu are plants adapted to drought. Only above ground portions are damaged by frost; thick storage roots grow as deep as 1 metre. It forms new perennial root crowns from stem nodes touching the ground.

The ecological requirements of the species are those of the subtropical and temperate habitat areas.

In Europe, Pueraria montana grows in several places in the warm regions of Switzerland and Italy near Lake Maggiore and Lake Lugano.

During World War II, kudzu was introduced to Vanuatu and Fiji by United States Armed Forces to serve as camouflage for equipment. It is now a major weed there.

Pueraria montana is also becoming a problem in Queensland.

In the United States, Pueraria montana is extensively reported in the coastal states from eastern Texas to Florida, North to Maryland, as well as inland in Arkansas, Kentucky, Missouri, Pennsylvania, Tennessee, Washington, D.C., and West Virginia. Since 2004, Kudzu has moved farther North along the Ohio River, appearing in Illinois, Indiana, and Ohio. Of all affected states, three in the southeast have the heaviest infestations: Georgia, Alabama, and Mississippi.

Effects on biodiversity 

Due to the aggressive, climbing nature of P. montana it often causes shading and death of native vegetation, resulting in a monoculture of P. montana. As P. montana spreads, it shades and crushes its competitors with its weight, eliminating everything in its path. As a result of growing over native plants and trees, it blocks their access of vital resources such as sunlight, killing off young vegetation. These result in dramatic reductions in native biodiversity at the local level.

Other than the loss of biodiversity of plant species, P. montana may have a negative effect on animals. Many plant species that are suppressed by P. montana because of its uncontrolled and rapid growth negatively impacts some wildlife animals that have specific mutualisms or feeding relationships with these plant species. This potentially could lead to the death of certain animal species, specifically herbivores, that depend on some vegetation as a resource for both food and shelter. These are important factors that lead to habitat destruction and reduction in animal biodiversity.

Impacts of global changes 
Changes in the global environment such as higher CO2 levels, higher temperatures, greater rates of nitrogen deposition, and greater fragmentation of natural habitats are predicted to increase the spread of P. montana.

Carbon dioxide 
Kudzu is highly responsive to increased CO2 levels as it results in maximal leaf expansion, increase in leaf size, and an overall 12% increase in leaf production.  In turn, the plant has higher turgor pressure which results in the improvements in its growth potential. As the atmospheric CO2 concentration continues to rise, it is possible for the potential enhancement of P. montana’s invasiveness.

Temperature 
With global warming, overnight temperatures tend to increase. Data collected in the United States over the past few decades showed a reduction in frost days, an earlier date for the last freeze in spring, and a later date for the first freeze in fall. These favour the spread of  P. montana.  

The northward distribution of P. montana is hypothesized to be limited by low temperatures. Cold temperatures cause their leaves to be killed off and their leaf expansion to be lagged. However, with the continuous rise in global temperature, it is predicted that P. montana will rapidly spread northward as a result of the increased number of warmer days.

References

 L. J. G. van der Maesen: Pueraria, the kudzu and its relatives: an update of the taxonomy, In: Proc. 1st Int. Symp. Tuberous legumes. Guadeloupe, FWI, 1992, S. 55–86. - Pueraria montana auf S. 65.
 Delin Wu & Mats Thulin: Pueraria in der Flora of China, Volume 10, S. 246: Pueraria montana - Online.

External links

 Pueraria montana var. lobata at US Forest Service Fire Effects Information System, access date: 14. Juni 2010
 
 
 Pueraria montana var. lobata at Plants For A Future database.
 Pueraria montana at AgroForestryTree Database access date: 16. Juni 2010
 Invasive Plant Watch Network: Description file for "Kudzu", access date: 16. Juni 2010
 Pueraria montana at International Legume Database & Information Service - ILDIS, access date: 16. Juni 2010
 Plant Invaders of Mid-Atlantic Natural Areas: Kudzu at http://www.nps.gov/, access date: 16. Juni 2010
 Pueraria montana var. lobata at Institute of Pacific Islands Forestry - Pacific Island Ecosystems at Risk (PIER). access date: 16. Juni 2010
 Pueraria montana var. lobata at Invasive and Exotic Species of North America.

montana
Taxa named by João de Loureiro